McLean (born Anthony McLean, 24 June 1980) is an English singer from Dagenham, east London. He was signed to Asylum Records and then Atlantic Records. His debut single "Broken" was released on 26 October 2009. The song was produced by The Schizofreniks and first released independently on 26 March 2007 on Schizofreniks Records, and has since then accrued over 20 million hits across major social networking sites, including YouTube and MySpace.

Early life and career
McLean was born in 1980 in East London and grew up in Dagenham, Essex. He is the son of the lovers rock musician, John McLean. He is the brother of the footballer Aaron McLean. Under the pseudonym of "Digga", he collaborated with MJ Cole on "Gotta Have It"; then with drum and bass duo Chase & Status on the song "Take U There", which featured on the debut album, More Than Alot. “Broken” was the underground song that caught the eye of big record companies and Mclean was signed to Atlantic.

Debut album
McLean worked with record producers Fraser T Smith, Phil Tan, Dylan "3D" Dresdow, Nate 'Danja' Hills, plus Naughty Boy (of Wiley and Chipmunk fame). Confirmed songs included "My Name", "Great Escape", "Try Me", "Finally in Love", "Broken" and the Smith-produced "One More Night". However, the album was never released. In 2013, Mclean released a free album on SoundCloud called Digga’s House. In 2019, there were rumours McLean was soon to release a much anticipated EP.

Personal life
He is the nephew of 1990s singer Bitty McLean and is the older brother of professional footballer Aaron McLean.

McLean has two daughters from a past relationship and is currently residing in Essex with his partner.

Discography

Singles

Guest appearances

References

External links

1980 births
Living people
21st-century Black British male singers
British hip hop singers
British contemporary R&B singers
English soul singers
Asylum Records artists
Atlantic Records artists
English people of Guyanese descent